Kalyanam Kamaneeyam is a 2023 Indian Telugu-language romantic comedy film written and directed by debutant Anil Kumar Aalla. It is produced by UV Concepts, a subsidiary of UV Creations. It features Santosh Sobhan and Priya Bhavani Shankar (in her Telugu debut) in the lead roles.

Kalyanam Kamaneeyam was released on 14 January 2023.

Plot 

The film opens with a young man, Shiva (Santosh Sobhan), narrating his story.

Shiva is an engineering graduate and is jobless. He's in love with Shruti (Priya Bhavani Shankar), a software developer in a reputed firm. He confronts his father that he wants to marry her. Initially thinking it as a joke, he later realizes that his son is serious about it and the family goes to fix an alliance. Shiva's father doesn't want him to get married to Shruti as he's unemployed. Shruti's father talks to him in private and tells him that her mother (Pavitra Lokesh) has pancreatic cancer and will not survive for more than an year. Which is why, he wants her mother to see Shruti get married. Shiva's father agrees. They get married and start a new life.

In the initial days of their marriage life, Shiva & Shruti are totally happy and loving. One day, Shruti sees a notice that her company has some job openings and asks Shiva to apply for it. He does it and through Shruti, he gets called for an interview. He performs really well in the interview and the interviewer, Chari, is impressed thus, clearing Shiva for on boarding. While Chari is on his way to submit the new recruitment files, he's stopped by the assistant manager, Bhushan (Satyam Rajesh) who lusts Shruti and tears Shiva's documents for on boarding. He promises Chari an on site job in the US & asks him not to recruit Shiva. When the CEO asks Chari about the new recruitments, he deliberately insults Shiva in-front of Shruti. Disturbed, she returns home in a very angry mood and starts to yell at Shiva for not behaving responsibly and also for not getting the job. He gets hurt and consumes alcohol with his friend and gets caught by the police under drink & drive case. The next day, Shruti comes and relieves him from the police station by filling up the formalities. Meanwhile, Shruti receives vulgar texts from an unknown number and with the help of her friend, she gets to know that it's Bhushan. She warns him not to repeat it. Nevertheless, Bhushan remains the same.

A few days later, Shruti's friend tells her to ask Shiva to go to a job consultancy firm that promises a respectable job in some company. Shruti asks Shiva to do so and he does it but, the consultancy demands an amount of 10,00,000 INR for the job. He tells this to Shruti and she takes loan from a bank and asks Shiva to collect the money and pay the consultancy. After he takes the money from the bank, he gets robbed. He chases the thief but in vain. He gets stuck and is scared to tell this to Shruti. He decides to take up a cab driver job that one of his friends has as a side income and pay off the EMI. To manage Shruti, he gets a fake ID card and offer letter from the same company his friend works in. Shruti is impressed and is totally happy for Shiva. Shiva drops her at the office everyday and pretends to go to his office only to take up the cab driver job. One day, a man, Giri (Saptagiri), takes his cab and tells that he has a telephonic interview. He receives the call mid of the journey and asks Shiva to take the call as he isn't confident. Shiva takes the interview pretending to be Giri and gives his best thus, clearing Giri's interview. They celebrate and he gets a call from Shruti that she's at his office. He rushes to his friend's office and asks him to manage Shruti somehow till he reaches. He comes just in time and they share a caring moment.

The next day, Bhushan asks Shruti to do overtime via Chari. She does it, having no other go. She returns home tired and disturbed. Shiva goes through her phone and sees Bhushan's indecent messages. He immediately rushes to find him and thrashes him. He also warns him to leave Shruti alone. In order to take revenge, Bhushan hires some goons and asks them to follow Shiva and beat him up. They call Bhushan and inform him that he is working as a cab driver. Bhushan decides to spill this to Shruti. He arranges a team meeting and presents Shiva & his cab driver media making Shruti go out of control. She confronts him and parts ways with him telling him that she couldn't even stay one year with him. 

A few days later, Shiva informs Shruti that her mother died. They attend the funeral and later, her father starts consuming alcohol again after many years. When confronted, he tells her how her mother was the only supportive person throughout his life even when he had nothing and lost millions in business. He also tells her that before calling Shiva's family for the alliance, he talked to Shiva about their marriage. Shiva initially denied marrying her as he's jobless and feels that he needs to be responsible to get married. When Shruti's father tells him that her mother has very less time to live, he immediately agrees and understands the pain of her father which makes her father realize how good of a person he is. Shruti feels bad because of how she misunderstood Shiva and goes to him. Meanwhile, the on site job that Bhushan promised to Chari is given to some girl under Bhushan. Chari confronts Bhushan about this and gets slapped by him in the argument. 

On her way back to Shiva, Shruti receives a call from Chari telling her everything that happened with Shiva's job at their office and also about the thrashing Shiva gave to Bhushan. She feels immense regret and apologizes to Shiva. They reconcile happily. Shruti goes back to her office and slaps Bhushan twice for the things he has done. She leaves the job and tells Shiva that they both will go on job trials from the next day.

Couple days later, Shiva goes for an interview. He gets called by the CEO to his cabin. There, he finds Giri in the CEO position of that company. When asked how he landed there, Giri tells him that his father-in-law has asked Giri to get a software job just to prove his talent so that he can handover his company to him which he did get because of Shiva's help the other day. Giri offers Shiva a good position in his company.

Cast 
 Santosh Sobhan as Shiva
 Priya Bhavani Shankar as Shruti
 Devi Prasad as Shruti's father
 Pavitra Lokesh as Shruti's mother
 Kedar Shankar as Shiva's father
 Satyam Rajesh as Bhushan, Shruti's manager
 Rajiv Kumar Aneja
 Saptagiri as Giri
 Saddham as Koushik

Production 
Santosh Sobhan and Priya Bhavani Shankar play the lead roles. It was shot by Karthik Gattamneni.

Music 
The music rights of the film are owned by Aditya Music. Shravan Bharadwaj composed the music and background score for the film.

References

External links 

 

Indian romantic comedy films
Films shot in Hyderabad, India
2023 films
Films set in Hyderabad, India
2023 romantic comedy films